Saleh Mashhud (also Romanized as Şāleḩ Mashhūd; also known as Şāleḩ Mashhadad is a village in Shavur Rural District, Shavur District, Shush County, Khuzestan Province, Iran. At the 2006 census, its population was 287, in 41 families.

References 

Populated places in Shush County